Paul Unwin may refer to:

 Paul Unwin (cricketer) (born 1967), New Zealand cricketer
 Paul Unwin (director) (born 1957), UK-based film and television director